Vladislav Novikov (born 10 November 1993 in Toksovo, Russia) is an alpine skier from Russia. He competed for Russia at the 2014 Winter Olympics in the alpine skiing events.

References

1993 births
Living people
Olympic alpine skiers of Russia
Alpine skiers at the 2014 Winter Olympics
Russian male alpine skiers
People from Vsevolozhsky District
Competitors at the 2015 Winter Universiade
Sportspeople from Leningrad Oblast